Hooman "Mo" Tavakolian (born Mohammad Ali Tavakolian, September 17, 1976) is an Iranian-American former wrestler, wrestling coach, sports diplomat and a member of United World Wrestling. Tavakolian was nominated in 2017 for the Peace and Sport Federation's “Diplomatic Action of the Year” award for his efforts to bring together the Islamic Republic of Iran Wrestling Federation and the USA Wrestling Federation through the 2017 Wrestling World Cup, during which he was leader of the US team. Iran, the World Cup host, had initially barred the US team from competing in retaliation for President Trump's travel bans. He is a 2017 National Wrestling Hall of Fame and Museum inductee. He also is Chief Compliance Officer at Cyrus Capital Partners and Vice President of the New York Athletic Club Wrestling Club.

Early life
Hooman Tavakolian was born September 17, 1976 in Tehran, Iran. At the age of nine, Tavakolian, his parents and younger brother immigrated to Great Neck, New York during the height of the Iran-Iraq War.

Career
Tavakolian began his wrestling career in 1986. He wrestled at the NCAA Division 1 level for Hofstra University, and later, Hunter College. At Hunter, he wrestled in three weight classes (from 157 to 174 lbs.). In his senior year, he became team captain under coach Bob Gaudenzi. Following graduation from Hunter College in 1999 with a degree in Psychology, he retired from competitive wrestling. Tavakolian served as the Hunter College Wrestling Team Assistant Coach for two seasons.

Philanthropy
In 2011, he founded the “Become Your Own Dream” scholarship with wife Lorelei Martin and former Hunter College wrestler and mentor, Jon Tush. Each year the scholarship provides $2500 to a graduating high school senior in New York City who plans to wrestle in college. In 2012, Tavakolian partnered the fund with the long-standing youth development program, Beat the Streets New York City. He has also funded mats and sport facilities for Iranian people in wrestling.

Tavakolian launched a campaign to collects funds and to rebuild the Maiwand Wrestling Club in Kabul, Afghanistan following a September 5 ISIS attack. Wrestling fans around the world and prominent champions such as Jordan Burroughs joined the campaign and soon after their donations, including wrestling equipment, reached Kabul.

In 2019, Tavakolian founded Hoomanities Inc., a not for profit organization "To encourage global community, to empower adolescent youth around the world and to reinstate hope in humanity through sports."

References

External links 
 Tavakolian interview with Persian VOA

1976 births
Living people
Iranian male sport wrestlers
Sportspeople from Tehran
Thomas Jefferson School of Law people